Navel-gazing or omphaloskepsis is the contemplation of one's navel as an aid to meditation.

Actual use of the practice as an aid to contemplation of basic principles of the cosmos and human nature is found in the practice of yoga or Hinduism and sometimes in the Eastern Orthodox Church. In yoga, the navel is the site of the manipura (also called nabhi) chakra, which yogis consider "a powerful chakra of the body". The monks of Mount Athos, Greece, were described as Omphalopsychians by J.G. Millingen, writing in the 1830s, who says they "...pretended or fancied that they experienced celestial joys when gazing on their umbilical region, in converse with the Deity".

However, phrases such as "contemplating one's navel" or "navel-gazing" are frequently used, usually in jocular fashion, to refer to self-absorbed pursuits.

See also 
Hesychast controversy
Kundalini
Meditative qigong
Palamism
Self-hypnosis
Trance

References

Meditation
Philosophical phrases
Quotations from philosophy
Navel